The 1991–92 Los Angeles Kings season, was the Kings' 25th season in the National Hockey League. It saw the Kings finishing second in the Smythe Division with a record of 35–31–14. However, they were eliminated in the first round of the Stanley Cup Playoffs by the Edmonton Oilers in six games.

Offseason
In the Entry Draft, the Kings first pick, in the second round, was used to choose Guy Leveque from the Cornwall Royals of the Ontario Hockey League. Their first-round pick had been dealt to the Edmonton Oilers in the Wayne Gretzky trade.

Pre-season

On September 27, 1991, the Kings played the New York Rangers in the first ever outdoor NHL game in Las Vegas, Nevada, at Caesars Palace. This was also the first NHL game in Las Vegas since 1968. The crowd on hand was 13,000 with the Kings beating the Rangers 5 to 2.

Regular season

Season standings

Schedule and results

Playoffs
The Kings lost in the Division Semi-finals to the Edmonton Oilers, four games to two.

Player statistics

Forwards
Note: GP = Games played; G = Goals; A = Assists; Pts = Points; PIM = Penalties in minutes

Defensemen
Note: GP = Games played; G=  Goals; A = Assists; Pts = Points; PIM = Penalty minutes

Goaltending
Note: GP = Games played; W = Wins; L = Losses; T = Ties; SO = Shutouts; GAA = Goals against average

Awards and records

Transactions
The Kings were involved in the following transactions during the 1991–92 season.

Trades

Free agents lost

Lost in expansion draft

Draft picks
Los Angeles's draft picks at the 1991 NHL Entry Draft held at the Buffalo Memorial Auditorium in Buffalo, New York.

See also
 1991–92 NHL season

References
 Kings on Hockey Database

Los Angeles Kings seasons
Los
Los
LA Kings
LA Kings